In Greek mythology, Pandaie or Pandae (Ancient Greek: Πανδαίη) was a daughter of Heracles whom he fathered in India.

Mythology 
Pandaie was said to have been assigned a kingdom in India by her father, who established specific laws for it, and to become its eponym. According to the historian Megasthenes, she was also given by Heracles 500 elephants, 4000 horses and infantry of 130 000.

According to Pliny the Elder, Pandaie was the only female child of Heracles (which, however, contradicts the accounts that mention Macaria, Eucleia and Manto as his daughters), and was therefore especially favored by him. For that reason he made her queen of the Pandae, who since then became the only nation throughout India to be ruled by women. Pandaie's descendants, Pliny relates, reigned over three hundred cities and commanded an army of 5,100 plus five hundred elephants.

Polyaenus informs that Heracles allotted to Pandaie the southern part of India which is by the sea, subdividing it into 365 cantons and imposing on each a yearly tax that was to be paid on a certain fixed day of the year. Should a canton refuse to pay, other ones would be obliged to compensate the loss.

See also
Meenakshi

Notes

References 
 Pliny the Elder, The Natural History. John Bostock, M.D., F.R.S. H.T. Riley, Esq., B.A. London. Taylor and Francis, Red Lion Court, Fleet Street. 1855. Online version at the Perseus Digital Library.
 Pliny the Elder, Naturalis Historia. Karl Friedrich Theodor Mayhoff. Lipsiae. Teubner. 1906. Latin text available at the Perseus Digital Library.

Women in Greek mythology
Heracleidae
Children of Heracles
Indian characters in Greek mythology